Argyrotaenia atrata is a species of moth of the family Tortricidae. It is found in Tungurahua Province, Ecuador.

The wingspan is about 21 mm. The ground colour of the forewings is grey with whitish grey suffusions and diffuse grey strigulation (fine streaks). The markings are grey with black marks. The hindwings are whitish grey with brownish admixture on the peripheries.

Etymology
The species name refers to the presence of black marks on the forewings and is derived from Latin atratus (meaning marked black).

References

Moths described in 2009
atrata
Moths of South America